GX, Gx, or gx may refer to:

Airlines
 Guangxi Beibu Gulf Airlines (IATA airline designator GX)
 Air Ontario (1983-2001, former IATA airline designator GX)
 JetMagic (2003-2004, former IATA airline designator GX)

Arts, entertainment, and media
 GX (gaming expo), a non-gambling game convention in Toronto, Ontario, Canada
 GX Jupitter-Larsen, an American artist and writer
 F-Zero GX, a racing video game for the Nintendo GameCube console
 Pokémon-GX, a part of the Pokémon Trading Card Game
 Symphogear GX, the third season of Symphogear, an anime series
 Yu-Gi-Oh! GX, an anime series

Vehicles
 GX (rocket), a Japanese launch vehicle
 Buick Encore GX, a 2019–present American subcompact SUV
 Buick Excelle GX, the station wagon variant of the 2015–present Buick Excelle GT Chinese compact sedan
 Chery Arrizo GX, a 2018–present Chinese compact sedan
 Lexus GX, a 2002–present Japanese full-size SUV

Other uses
Ĝ, sometimes written as Gx or gx, a letter in the Esperanto alphabet
Gx, in mobile telephony, the on-line policy interface in the GPRS core network
GX, a conservation rank meaning "globally presumed extinct" in the NatureServe conservation status system
Gerrards Cross, a town in Buckinghamshire, England
Global Xpress, a satellite communication system
Guangxi, an autonomous region of China (Guobiao abbreviation GX)
Opera GX, a "gaming" browser from Opera Software
gx, an abbreviation for grex (horticulture), used to describe hybrids of orchids